"Shining Star" is a popular song written by the American songwriters and music producers Leo Graham and Paul Richmond. The song was recorded in 1980 by popular American R&B vocal group The Manhattans and released the same year on the album After Midnight. "Shining Star" was released as a single in 1980 and peaked at number 4 on the US Billboard R&B chart, and number 5 on the U.S. Billboard Hot 100. The song was most successful in New Zealand, where it reached position number 2; the same position that it also reached in the Black Oriented Singles of the Record World magazine in the USA. Although it did not reach the number-one on any chart, "Shining Star" was The Manhattans's highest charting hit since the worldwide hit "Kiss and Say Goodbye" released in 1976.

It should not be confused with the song "Shining Star" by American band Earth, Wind & Fire, which is a different song from 1975.

Grammy Award
"Shining Star" won the Grammy Award for Best R&B Performance by a Duo or Group with Vocals in 1980. It was the only Grammy Award received by The Manhattans.

Track listing

The full length of "Shining Star" on the album After Midnight is 4:40. The length of 3:45 on the 7" single is an edited version of the song.

B-side
The B-side of the "Shining Star"'s 7" single contains the song "I'll Never Run Away From Love Again", which was also recorded by The Manhattans in 1980 for the album After Midnight. It was written by lead vocalist Gerald Alston and Barbara Morr. The song is the last track on the album and was produced by Norman Harris and The Manhattans.

Charts, certifications, and accolades

Weekly charts

Awards

Year-end charts

End-of-decade charts

Certifications and sales

Personnel
 Written by – Leo Graham and Paul Richmond
 Lead Vocal – Gerald Alston
 Backing vocals – Winfred "Blue" Lovett, Edward "Sonny" Bivins, Kenneth "Wally" Kelly
 Arranged by –  James Mack

Credits
 Producer – Leo Graham
 Associate Producer – James Mack
 Executive Producer – Mickey Eichner
 Coordinator (Production) – Hermi Hanlin
 Engineer (Mastering) – Stu Romaine

Companies
 Recorded at – Universal Studios, Chicago
 Mastered at – CBS Recording Studios, New York City, NY
 Manufactured By – Columbia Records
 Phonographic Copyright ℗ – CBS, Inc.
 Copyright  – CBS, Inc.

Notes
 ℗  1980 CBS, Inc.
 Taken From The Columbia Records LP After Midnight JC 36411

In popular culture
"Shining Star" was performed many times by the Jerry Garcia Band during their 1991 through 1994 tours. It frequently appeared to open or near the beginning of the second set. On October 6, 1993, at The Warfield Theater, the band opened the second set with the song. The audience spontaneously began singing the chorus in unison towards the end of the song and the band quieted and riffed off the audience. This became the standard and the song was always performed with audience participation from then on, extending to a length of up to 25 minutes in some performances. The band was so amused that they opened the second set with "Shining Star" again the following night. This was not the first instance of the audience taking part. See the April 24, 1993 show, also at the Warfield. The song was used in the 1983 Derrick episode "Die kleine Ahrens" and the 2006 Cold Case episode "Baby Blues". From 1999, "Shining Star" began to be interpreted in Brazil by the Brazilian singer Maurício Manieri, in his own Portuguese version "Pensando em Você".

Portuguese version
In 1998, "Shining Star" won a Portuguese version in Brazil, performed by Brazilian singer and musician Maurício Manieri. This version received the title "Pensando em Você", with lyrics in Portuguese written by Manieri himself, and was released on his album A Noite Inteira in 1998. "Pensando em Você" was released as a single in Brazil and Portugal in 1999, and became a big hit of Maurício Manieri, reaching position number 5 in the national parade of Brazil and position number 49 in Portugal (according to the discography of Manieri in Wikipedia in Portuguese). The credits for "Pensando em Você" ("Shining Star") are by Leo Graham and Paul Richmond, version Mauricio Manieri.

See also
List of Billboard Year-End Hot 100 singles of 1980
List of 23rd Annual Grammy Awards of 1980
List of Grammy Award for Best R&B Performance by a Duo or Group with Vocals

References

External links
 
 [ "Shining Star" song review]. Allmusic.com.

1980 songs
1980 singles
1980s ballads
The Manhattans songs
Rhythm and blues ballads
Soul ballads
Columbia Records singles
Songs written by Leo Graham (songwriter)